The red-tailed minla (Minla ignotincta) is a passerine bird in the family Leiothrichidae. It is the only species in the genus Minla. 

It is found in the Indian subcontinent and Southeast Asia.  Its range includes Bangladesh, Bhutan, India, Laos, Myanmar, Nepal, Thailand and Vietnam. Its natural habitat is subtropical or tropical moist montane forests.

References

 Collar, N. J. & Robson C. 2007. Family Timaliidae (Babblers)  pp. 70 – 291 in; del Hoyo, J., Elliott, A. & Christie, D.A. eds. Handbook of the Birds of the World, Vol. 12. Picathartes to Tits and Chickadees. Lynx Edicions, Barcelona.

External links
 http://animaldiversity.ummz.umich.edu/site/accounts/pictures/Minla_ignotincta.html Images at ADW]

red-tailed minla
Birds of Nepal
Birds of Eastern Himalaya
Birds of Central China
Birds of South China
Birds of Laos
Birds of Myanmar
Birds of Vietnam
Birds of Yunnan
red-tailed minla
Taxonomy articles created by Polbot